Colasposoma bonvouloiri is a species of leaf beetle of South Africa and the Democratic Republic of the Congo. It was first described by Édouard Lefèvre in 1877.

References

bonvouloiri
Beetles of the Democratic Republic of the Congo
Taxa named by Édouard Lefèvre
Insects of South Africa
Beetles described in 1877